Edward Carter was an English Anglican priest in the 17th century.

Carter was born in St Albans and educated at Magdalen College, Oxford. He held livings at Ayot St Lawrence and King's Langley He was  Archdeacon of St Albans from 1683 until his death in 1688.

Notes

1688 deaths
17th-century English Anglican priests
Archdeacons of St Albans
Alumni of Magdalen College, Oxford
People from St Albans